Salahiddine Khlifi (born 14 March 1979 in Bouknadel) is a Moroccan football player, who currently plays for Chabab Rif Al Hoceima.

Notes

1979 births
Living people
Moroccan footballers
Association football midfielders
Expatriate footballers in Saudi Arabia
Neuchâtel Xamax FCS players
Expatriate footballers in Switzerland
Swiss Super League players
Expatriate footballers in Germany
Moroccan expatriate footballers
Ittihad FC players
Moroccan expatriate sportspeople in Germany
People from Bouknadel
Chabab Rif Al Hoceima players
COD Meknès players
Wydad de Fès players